The Young Master is a 1980 Hong Kong martial arts film starring and directed by Jackie Chan,  who also wrote the screenplay with Edward Tang, Lau Tin-chi and Tung Lu. The film co-stars Yuen Biao, Fung Fung and Shih Kien. The film was released on 9 February 1980.

Notable for being the first film that Jackie Chan worked on for Golden Harvest, it is his second film as director. The film was produced by Raymond Chow and Leonard Ho.

Plot
The school attended by Dragon and his brother, Tiger is entered against a rival school in a Lion dance competition. The school needs to win the prize money to remain open but their star performer, Tiger, is seemingly injured when he falls from a ladder, leaving his brother, Dragon, to take his place. During the competition, Dragon realizes that his brother feigned his accident in order to take part in the competition for the rival school.

The rival school wins the competition, but the truth emerges about Tiger's betrayal and he is exiled in disgrace. However, Dragon vows to bring back his errant brother so the pair can make amends to their master. Dragon sets off on his mission, but en route is mistaken for a criminal known as The White Fan by local police chief, Sang Kung along with his son and daughter. Meanwhile, Tiger collaborates with his employers (the rival school) by freeing a dangerous criminal known as Kam. However, Tiger is later framed for a bank robbery. To stop his brother from being arrested, Dragon promises to apprehend the escapee, Kam.

The Young Master ends with a furious, brutal fight between Kam and Dragon, in which Dragon sustains substantial damage. At the beginning of the fight, it appears that Kam has the upper hand as he punishes Dragon with blindingly fast punches and kicks. However, after consuming water from an opium pipe given to him by a whimsical old man, Dragon becomes energized and defeats Kam. The Young Master ends with Dragon returning to his hometown, a hero (albeit one in full body cast from the many injuries he sustained).

Cast
 Jackie Chan as Dragon Lung
 Yuen Biao as Sang Kung's son / Fourth Brother
 Tien Feng as Master Tien
 Fung Fung as Ah Suk
 Lee Hoi-sang as Kam's Second Bodyguard
 Fung Hak-kun as Kam's First Bodyguard
 Wei Pai as Tiger
 Shih Kien as Sang Kung
 Lily Li as Sang Kung's Daughter
 Hwang In-Shik as Master Kam
 Fan Mei - Sheng as Bull
 Yue Tau-ean as Cross Eye
 Bruce Tang Yim-chan as Ah Chang

Production
Chan nearly suffocated when he injured his throat.

Music
The theme song played over the closing credits, Kung Fu Fighting Man was the first song recorded and performed by Jackie Chan. He has since gone on to release many records, and has performed the theme songs on many of his films.

Versions
There are two main versions of the film; a 106-minute Hong Kong cut, and a 90-minute international cut.

The original version of the film that Chan handed over to Golden Harvest was reportedly three hours in length.

Box office
In Hong Kong, the film grossed HK$1,026,283. In South Korea, it was the highest-grossing film of 1980, with 436,631 box office admissions in Seoul City, equivalent to an estimated . In Japan, it was the 21st highest-grossing film of 1981, earning . In Spain (where it released in 1982), the film sold 288,196 tickets, equivalent to an estimated .

See also

 Jackie Chan filmography
 List of Hong Kong films
 List of martial arts films

References

External links

1980 films
1980 martial arts films
1980s Cantonese-language films
Films directed by Jackie Chan
Golden Harvest films
Hapkido films
Hong Kong martial arts comedy films
Karate films
Kung fu films
1980s Hong Kong films